Franz Josef Czernin (born 7 January 1952, Vienna) is an Austrian writer. He is a member of the Bohemian noble Czernin family.

Awards and honors  
 1993: Stadtschreiber von Graz
 1997: Literaturpreis der Stadt Wien
 1998: Anton-Wildgans-Preis
 1998: Heimito von Doderer-Literaturpreis, Sonderpreis für Literarische Essayistik
 2003: Heimrad-Bäcker-Preis
 2004: Literaturpreis des Landes Steiermark
 2007: Georg-Trakl-Preis
 2007: Österreichischer Staatspreis für Literaturkritik
 2011: Magus-Preis der Gesellschaft zur Förderung der westfälischen Kulturarbeit
 2012: H. C. Artmann-Preis
 2015: Ernst-Jandl-Preis

References

1952 births
Living people
Austrian writers
Writers from Vienna